The Greek Men's Handball Championship, or Handball Premier, is the most important competition of Greek handball. The competition which is organised by Hellenic Handball Federation (Greek: ΟΧΕ) started in 1979–80 season. The most successful team is Ionikos Nea Filadelfeia who has won ten titles. The last title was won by Olympiacos.

Evangelos Kalfarentzos, fitness director of the Panhellenic Gymnastics Association of Athens (Panellinios), physical education teacher and author, recognized as rapporteur of the sport in Greece.

Competition format
The season begins with a tournament between the twelve teams. The first six teams qualify for a play-off round, while the last three plays play-out.
The top two teams of the play-off round qualifies directly to the semifinals, while the others four plays the top two teams of the play-out round in quarterfinals.

2022/23 Season participants

The following 12 clubs compete in the Handball Premier during the 2022–23 season.

Previous champions

Panhellenic Championship (1979–80 to 1981–82)
 1980 :  Ionikos Nea Filadelfeia
 1981 :  Ionikos Nea Filadelfeia (2)
 1982 :  Ionikos Nea Filadelfeia (3)
Alpha Ethniki (1982–83 to 1988–89)
 1983 :  Ionikos Nea Filadelfeia (4)
 1984 :  Ionikos Nea Filadelfeia (5)
 1985 :  Ionikos Nea Filadelfeia (6)
 1986 :  Filippos Veria
 1987 :  Ionikos Nea Filadelfeia (7)
 1988 :  Filippos Veria (2)
 1989 :  Filippos Veria (3)
A1 Ethniki (1989–90 to 2014–15)
 1990 :  Filippos Veria
 1991 :  Filippos Veria (5)

 1992 :  Ionikos Nea Filadelfeia (8)
 1993 :  Ionikos Nea Filadelfeia (9)
 1994 :  Filippos Veria (6)
 1995 :  Filippos Veria (7)
 1996 :  ESN Vrilissia
 1997 :  GE Veria
 1998 :  ASE Douka
 1999 :  Ionikos Nea Filadelfeia (10)
 2000 :  Panellinios
 2001 :  ASE Douka (2)
 2002 :  Panellinios (2)
 2003 :  Filippos Veria (8)
 2004 :  Panellinios (3)
 2005 :  Athinaikos
 2006 :  Panellinios (4)
 2007 :  Panellinios (5)

 2008 :  ASE Douka (3)
 2009 :  PAOK
 2010 :  PAOK (2)
 2011 :  AEK
 2012 :  Diomidis Argous
 2013 :  AEK (2)
 2014 :  Diomidis Argous (2)
 2015 :  PAOK (3)
Handball Premier (2015–16 to present)
 2016 :  Filippos Veria (9)
 2017 :  IEK Xini DIKEAS
 2018 :   Olympiacos
 2019 :  Olympiacos (2)
 2020 :  AEK (3)
 2021 :  AEK (4)
 2022 :  Olympiacos (3)

Performances

By club

By city 
Twelve clubs from five cities have won the championship.

EHF coefficient ranking

Greek handball clubs in European competitions
EHF Cup Winners' Cup:

EHF European Cup:

Sources
Hellenic Handball Federation, Champions

References

External links
Hellenic Handball Federation
Hatzi Handball

Handball in Greece
Greece
Hand
Men's sports competitions in Greece
Handball
Professional sports leagues in Greece